Niza may refer to:
Spanish for the city of Nice, France
 Niza, Croatia, a village near Koška
Niiza, Saitama, Japan
Marcos de Niza, a 16th-century Franciscan friar

See also
Nesa (disambiguation)
Neza
Nisa (disambiguation)
Nise
Nizza (disambiguation)
Nysa (disambiguation)
Nyssa (disambiguation)